Het Volk was a Belgian newspaper that focused on "news with a human undertone".

History
Het Volk was first published in 1891. It was the only paper controlled by the Christian labour organizations in Ghent. It opposed socialism. It adopted "anti-socialist daily" as its slogan. The paper was distributed in Ghent, Aalst and Brussels. In 1912, the slogan was changed to "Christian labourer's daily".

In 1925, Het Volk was the first newspaper in Belgium to publish a small Sunday issue, "Het Zondagsblad" ("The Sunday Paper"). In 1930 it adopted the subtitle "Catholic Democratic Newspaper of Flanders". During the Second World War, Het Volk sold 35,000 a day. It gained international attention in 1944 when it was the first - and for a time, the only - paper to report the Von Rundstedt Offensive in the Ardennes. After the war, Het Volk started organizing sports events. In 1945, the first Omloop Het Volk cycling race was held. In 1952, Het Volk purchased De Nieuwe Gids, a Brussels newspaper. De Nieuwe Gids has disappeared. Their other "cover-paper" De Gentenaar existed.

In 1994, Het Volk was purchased by the Vlaamse Uitgeversmaatschappij. Then the paper became part of Corelio. Since 2001, differences between Het Volk, Het Nieuwsblad and De Gentenaar was small and restricted to the front page. In 2000, Het Volk left Ghent and moved to Groot-Bijgaarden, near Brussels.

Het Volk ceased publication on 10 May 2008 when it merged with its sister newspaper Het Nieuwsblad.

Mission statement
"You will find what you are looking for in Het Volk, the only newspaper where people really make the news. You will read everything on small and big events in your neighborhoods, your cities and far beyond. In Het Volk, you won't be forced to swallow pre-chewn articles on politics or economics, but real news with a human undertone."

Circulation
In 1980 its weekday circulation was 220,000. The paper's circulation in 2002 was 112,301 copies. Next year the circulation of the paper fell to 88,000 copies. Its circulation was 83,000 copies in 2004.

In 2006 Het Volk had an average weekday circulation of 77,000 copies, according to the Centrum voor Informatie over de Media. The circulation of the paper was 78,000 copies in 2007.

Het Volk had an average market share of 11.5% in Flanders. It was 8.9% in 2002.

Youth supplements
From 1947 until the late 1980s the newspaper published a weekly youth supplement named 't Kapoentje, which was notable for its comics. Together with Ons Volkske it was the leading and most important comic book magazine in Flanders.

Het Volkske was the weekly children's supplement of the Flemish newspaper Het Volk. The supplement appeared every Wednesday as this was the day schools in Flanders closed at noon (as opposed to 4 p.m. on Mondays, Tuesdays, Wednesdays and Fridays). Next to a letters page and a series of articles on music, movies and other subjects that might interest schoolchildren, the supplement also had a special children's news section where current events were explained in simple language.

Notes

External links
Newspapers in the class room  

1891 establishments in Belgium
2008 disestablishments in Belgium
Defunct newspapers published in Belgium
Dutch-language newspapers published in Belgium
Publications established in 1891
Publications disestablished in 2008